Marko Kopljar (born 12 February 1986) is a Croatian handball player for Füchse Berlin.

He competed at the 2012 Summer Olympics in London, winning the bronze medal.

Honours
Zagreb
Dukat Premier League: 2007-2008, 2008-09, 2009-10, 2010-11, 2011-12
Croatian Cup: 2008, 2009, 2010, 2011, 2012

PSG
LNH Division 1: 2012-13, 2014-15
Coupe de France: 2014, 2015
Trophée des champions: 2014, 2015

Barcelona
Liga ASOBAL: 2015-16
Copa del Rey: 2015-16
Copa ASOBAL: 2016
Supercopa ASOBAL: 2015

Veszprém
Nemzeti Bajnokság I: 2016-17
Magyar Kupa: 2017

References

1986 births
Living people
People from Požega, Croatia
Croatian male handball players
Olympic handball players of Croatia
Handball players at the 2012 Summer Olympics
Handball players at the 2016 Summer Olympics
Olympic bronze medalists for Croatia
Olympic medalists in handball
Medalists at the 2012 Summer Olympics
RK Medveščak Zagreb players
RK Zagreb players
FC Barcelona Handbol players
Liga ASOBAL players
Handball-Bundesliga players
Expatriate handball players
Croatian expatriate sportspeople in France
Croatian expatriate sportspeople in Germany
Croatian expatriate sportspeople in Hungary
Croatian expatriate sportspeople in Spain
Veszprém KC players
Füchse Berlin Reinickendorf HBC players